The 2006 NCAA Division I FBS football season was the highest level of college football competition in the United States organized by the National Collegiate Athletic Association (NCAA).

The regular season began on August 31, 2006 and ended on December 2, 2006. The postseason concluded on January 8, 2007 with the BCS National Championship Game in Glendale, Arizona, where the No. 2 Florida Gators defeated the No. 1 Ohio State Buckeyes by a score of 41–14 to win the national title.

The Boise State Broncos were the year's only undefeated team in both levels of Division I football after defeating Oklahoma in the Fiesta Bowl.

Rules changes
The NCAA instituted the following rule changes for the 2006 season.

The NCAA ruled that teams could schedule twelve regular-season games (up from eleven) beginning in the 2006 season. (NCAA teams in Alaska and Hawaii, and their home opponents, are allowed to schedule an extra game over and above this limit.)
Instant replay is now officially sanctioned and standardized. All plays are reviewed by the replay officials as the play occurs. They may call down to the on-field officials to stop play if they need extra time to make a review. Each coach may also make one challenge per game. In the case of a coach's challenge, the coach must have at least one time-out remaining. If the challenge is upheld the coach gets the time-out back but the challenge is spent. If the challenge is rejected, both the challenge and the time-out are spent.
Players may only wear clear eyeshields. Previously, both tinted and orange were also allowed.
The kicking tee has been lowered from two inches tall to only one inch.
Halftime lasts twenty minutes. Previously, it was only fifteen minutes, except for special ceremonies (i.e. homecoming). 
On a kickoff, the game clock starts when the ball is kicked rather than when the receiving team touches it.
 This rule change has resulted in controversy, highlighted by the matchup between Wisconsin and Penn State on November 4, 2006, in which Wisconsin deliberately went off-sides on two consecutive kickoffs to run extra time off the clock at the close of the first half.
 On a change of possession, the clock starts when the referee marks the ball ready for play, instead of on the snap. This was the rule in the National Football League prior to 1973, and in high school football prior to 1996. 
The referee may no longer stop the game due to excessive crowd noise.
When a live-ball penalty such as an illegal formation occurs on a kick, the receiving team may choose either to add the penalty yardage to the end of the return or require the kick to be attempted again with the spot moved back. Previously, only the latter option was available.
If a team scores at the end of the game, they will not kick the extra point unless it would affect the outcome of the game.

Regular season top 10 matchups
Rankings reflect the AP Poll. Rankings for Week 8 and beyond will list BCS Rankings first and AP Poll second. Teams that failed to be a top 10 team for one poll or the other will be noted.
Week 2
No. 1 Ohio State defeated No. 2 Texas, 24–7 (Darrell K Royal–Texas Memorial Stadium, Austin, Texas)
Week 3
No. 3 Auburn defeated No. 6 LSU, 7–3 (Jordan-Hare Stadium, Auburn, Alabama)
Week 6
No. 5 Florida defeated No. 9 LSU, 23–10 (Ben Hill Griffin Stadium, Gainesville, Florida)
Week 10
No. 5/5 Louisville defeated No. 3/3 West Virginia, 44–34 (Papa John's Cardinal Stadium, Louisville, Kentucky)
Week 12
No. 1/1 Ohio State defeated No. 2/2 Michigan, 42–39 (Ohio Stadium, Columbus, Ohio)
Week 13
No. 3/3 USC defeated No. 5/6 Notre Dame, 44–24 (Los Angeles Memorial Coliseum, Los Angeles, California)
No. 10/9 LSU defeated No. 6/5 Arkansas, 31–26 (War Memorial Stadium, Little Rock, Arkansas)
Week 14
No. 4/4 Florida defeated No. 9/8 Arkansas, 38–28 (2006 SEC Championship Game, Georgia Dome, Atlanta, Georgia)

Conference standings

Conference champions

Conference championship games 
Rankings reflect the Week 14 AP Poll before the games were played.

Other conference champions 
Rankings are from the Week 15 AP Poll.

* Received conference's automatic BCS bowl bid.

BCS rankings progress

Ohio State was ranked No. 1 in all of the BCS-component polls (AP, Coaches', USA Today) in the preseason and the 14 polls taken in the regular season. When the BCS rankings began on October 15, Ohio State was No. 1 on all 8 rankings released during the season.

Bowl games
Winners are listed in boldface.

Bowl Championship Series
The Bowl Championship Series selected the No. 1 and No. 2 ranked teams to play for the national championship on January 8. The 2006 season marked a change for the BCS system, as the BCS National Championship Game became a standalone bowl game for the first time, to be played at the site of one of the four BCS bowls (the Fiesta, Orange, Sugar, and Rose Bowls) on a rotating basis. Under the previous format used from 1998 to 2006, the BCS National Championship coincided with one of the BCS bowls. The 2007 BCS Championship Game was played in Glendale, Arizona, the week after the Fiesta Bowl had been played there.

Rankings are from the Week 15 AP Poll.

January bowl games

December bowl games

Bowl Challenge Cup standings

Awards and honors

Heisman Trophy voting
The Heisman Trophy is given to the year's most outstanding player.

Winner: Troy Smith, Sr., Ohio State QB (2,540 pts)
2. Darren McFadden, So., Arkansas RB (878 pts)
3. Brady Quinn, Sr., Notre Dame QB (782 pts)
4. Steve Slaton, So., West Virginia RB (214 pts)
5. Mike Hart, Jr., Michigan RB (210 pts)
6. Colt Brennan, Jr., Hawaii QB (202 pts)

Other major award winners
Walter Camp Award (top player): Troy Smith, Ohio State
Maxwell Award (top player): Brady Quinn, Notre Dame
Associated Press College Football Player of the Year Award: Troy Smith, Ohio State
Bronko Nagurski Trophy (defensive player): James Laurinaitis, Ohio State
Chuck Bednarik Award (defensive player): Paul Posluszny, Penn State
Dave Rimington Trophy (center): Dan Mozes, West Virginia
Davey O'Brien Award (quarterback): Troy Smith, Ohio State
Dick Butkus Award (linebacker): Patrick Willis, Ole Miss
Doak Walker Award (running back): Darren McFadden, Arkansas
Draddy Trophy ("academic Heisman"): Brian Leonard, Rutgers
Fred Biletnikoff Award (wide receiver): Calvin Johnson, Georgia Tech
Jim Thorpe Award (defensive back): Aaron Ross, Texas
John Mackey Award (tight end): Matt Spaeth, Minnesota
Johnny Unitas Award (Sr. quarterback): Brady Quinn, Notre Dame
Lombardi Award (top lineman): LaMarr Woodley, Michigan
Lott Trophy (defensive impact): Dante Hughes, California
Lou Groza Award (placekicker): Art Carmody, Louisville
Manning Award (quarterback): JaMarcus Russell, LSU
Mosi Tatupu Award (special teams): A. J. Trapasso, Ohio State
Outland Trophy (interior lineman): Joe Thomas, Wisconsin
Ray Guy Award (punter): Daniel Sepulveda, Baylor
Ted Hendricks Award (defensive end): LaMarr Woodley, Michigan
The Home Depot Coach of the Year Award: Greg Schiano, Rutgers
Associated Press Coach of the Year: Jim Grobe, Wake Forest
Paul "Bear" Bryant Award (head coach): Chris Petersen, Boise State
Walter Camp Coach of the Year (head coach): Greg Schiano, Rutgers
Broyles Award (assistant coach): Bud Foster, Virginia Tech

Postseason coaching changes

See also
 FIU–Miami football brawl

References